Blanus alexandri, called Alexander's worm-lizard, is an amphisbaenian species in the family Blanidae. It is endemic in Adana, Hatay, Gaziantep, and Şırnak provinces of Turkey. It was formerly considered a subspecies of Blanus strauchi. It is named in honour of A. Allan Alexander, who studied the species.

References 

alexandri
Reptiles described in 2014
Taxa named by Roberto Sindaco
Taxa named by Panagiotis Kornilios
Taxa named by Roberto Sacchi
Taxa named by Petros Lymberakis
Reptiles of Turkey
Endemic fauna of Turkey